Home House is a Georgian town house at 20 Portman Square, London.  James Wyatt was appointed to design it by Elizabeth, Countess of Home in 1776, but by 1777 he had been dismissed and replaced by Robert Adam.  Elizabeth left the completed house on her death in 1784 to her nephew William Gale, who in turn left it to one of his aunts, Mrs Walsh, in 1785.  Its later occupants included the Marquis de la Luzerne during his time as French ambassador to the Court of St. James's (1788 to 1791), the 4th Duke of Atholl (1798 to 1808), the 4th Duke of Newcastle (1820 to 1861), Sir Francis Henry Goldsmid (1862 to 1919), and Lord and Lady Islington (1919 to 1926).

In 1926, it was leased by Samuel Courtauld to house his growing art collection.  On his wife's death in 1931, he gave the house and the collection to the fledgling Courtauld Institute of Art (which he had played a major part in founding) as temporary accommodation. A permanent accommodation was not forthcoming, and the Institute remained in the building until 1989, when it moved to its present home of Somerset House.  Home House then remained vacant for seven years, until it was acquired by Berkeley Adam Ltd. The building has been a private members' club since 1998. It was extended to include No. 21, as well as the original Nos. 19 and 20, in 2010.

It was home to artwork by Zaha Hadid in the form of a Cocktail Bar prior to its refurbishment in 2020.

Home House was appointed a Grade I listed building in 1954.

Further reading

References

Bibliography

External links
Courtauld Institute site
Home House, London
Lesley Lewis,  'Elizabeth, Countess of Home, and Her House in Portman Square', in The Burlington Magazine, Vol. 109, No. 773 (Aug., 1967), pp. 443–451+453
Image of a staircase at Home House

Courtauld Institute of Art
Georgian architecture in the City of Westminster
Grade I listed buildings in the City of Westminster
Grade I listed houses in London
Houses completed in 1776
Houses in the City of Westminster
Buildings and structures in Marylebone
Neoclassical architecture in England
Robert Adam buildings
Portman estate
Clubs and societies in London
Private members' clubs